The 2019 Algarve Cup was the 26th edition of the Algarve Cup, an invitational women's football tournament held annually in Portugal. It took place from 27 February to 6 March.

Norway defeated Poland 3–0 in the final to win their fifth title, and their first since the 1998 edition.

Format
The twelve invited teams were split into four groups to play a round-robin tournament.

Points awarded in the group stage followed the standard formula of three points for a win, one point for a draw and zero points for a loss. In the case of two teams being tied on the same number of points in a group, their head-to-head result determine the higher place.

Teams

Squads

Group stage
The groups were announced in mid-January 2019

All times are local (UTC±0).

Tie-breaking criteria
For the group stage of this tournament, where two or more teams in a group tied on an equal number of points, the finishing positions were determined by the following tie-breaking criteria in the following order:
 number of points obtained in the matches among the teams in question
 goal difference in all the group matches
 number of goals scored in all the group matches
 fair-play ranking in all the group matches
 FIFA ranking

Group A

Group B

Group C

Group D

Ranking of teams for placement matches
The ranking of the 1st, 2nd, and 3rd placed teams in each group to determine the placement matches:

1st placed teams

2nd placed teams

3rd placed teams

Placement matches

Eleventh place

Ninth place

Seventh place

Fifth place

Third place

Final

Final standings

Goalscorers

References

External links
Official website

 
Algarve Cup
Algarve Cup
Algarve Cup
Algarve Cup
Algarve Cup
Algarve Cup